Glengorm Castle, also known as Castle Sorn, is a 19th-century country house on the Isle of Mull, Scotland.

The Mishnish estate was purchased in 1856 by James Forsyth of Quinish. He cleared the existing township of Sorne to make way for the new house, which was completed in 1860. The name originated from Forsyth thinking that the air in the area was an odd colour, naming it "Glen Gorm" (meaning Blue Glen), but it had turned out that the blue smog was caused by the burning of the houses at Sorne.  The house was designed by Kinnear and Peddie in a Scots Baronial style. It is now operated as a guest house and wedding venue, with a café and shop in the former stables. The castle overlooks the Atlantic Ocean. On a clear day the Outer Hebrides and islands of Rùm and Canna can be viewed from the castle, as well as Coll on most days. It is currently managed by the Nelson family who operate the property as bed and breakfast accommodation.

References

External links

 Glengorm Castle website

Buildings and structures on the Isle of Mull
Castles in Argyll and Bute
Listed houses in Scotland
Category B listed buildings in Argyll and Bute